Matúš Horváth may refer to:

 Matúš Horváth, a victim of the 2022 Bratislava shooting 
 Matúš Horváth, captain of the FK Haniska football club